Gurom Daraq (also Romanized as Gūrom Daraq; also known as Gorom Darreh) is a village in Chahardangeh Rural District, Hurand District, Ahar County, East Azerbaijan Province, Iran. At the 2006 census, its population was 27, in 6 families.

References 

Populated places in Ahar County